The 1900 Pittsburgh Pirates season was the 19th season of the Pittsburgh Pirates franchise. The Pirates finished second in the National League with a record of 79–60.

Regular season

Season standings

Game log

|- bgcolor="ffbbbb"
| 1 || April 19 || @ Cardinals || 0–3 ||  ||  || — || 12,000 || 0–1
|- bgcolor="ccffcc"
| 2 || April 21 || @ Cardinals || 4–3 ||  ||  || — || — || 1–1
|- bgcolor="ffbbbb"
| 3 || April 22 || @ Cardinals || 5–6 ||  ||  || — || 20,000 || 1–2
|- bgcolor="ccffcc"
| 4 || April 23 || @ Reds || 6–0 ||  ||  || — || — || 2–2
|- bgcolor="ccffcc"
| 5 || April 24 || @ Reds || 5–3 ||  ||  || — || — || 3–2
|- bgcolor="ffbbbb"
| 6 || April 25 || @ Reds || 8–9 ||  ||  || — || — || 3–3
|- bgcolor="ffbbbb"
| 7 || April 26 || Reds || 11–12 ||  ||  || — || — || 3–4
|- bgcolor="ffbbbb"
| 8 || April 27 || Reds || 5–19 ||  ||  || — || — || 3–5
|- bgcolor="ffbbbb"
| 9 || April 28 || Reds || 4–7 ||  ||  || — || — || 3–6
|- bgcolor="ccffcc"
| 10 || April 29 || @ Reds || 8–6 ||  ||  || — || — || 4–6
|-

|- bgcolor="ccffcc"
| 11 || May 2 || Cardinals || 6–5 ||  ||  || — || — || 5–6
|- bgcolor="ffbbbb"
| 12 || May 3 || Cardinals || 2–9 ||  ||  || — || — || 5–7
|- bgcolor="ccffcc"
| 13 || May 5 || Cardinals || 5–1 ||  ||  || — || — || 6–7
|- bgcolor="ffbbbb"
| 14 || May 6 || @ Orphans || 6–7 ||  ||  || — || — || 6–8
|- bgcolor="ccffcc"
| 15 || May 7 || Orphans || 6–4 ||  ||  || — || — || 7–8
|- bgcolor="ffbbbb"
| 16 || May 8 || Orphans || 1–2 ||  ||  || — || — || 7–9
|- bgcolor="ccffcc"
| 17 || May 10 || Orphans || 5–4 ||  ||  || — || — || 8–9
|- bgcolor="ccffcc"
| 18 || May 12 || Beaneaters || 5–1 ||  ||  || — || — || 9–9
|- bgcolor="ccffcc"
| 19 || May 13 || @ Reds || 7–6 ||  ||  || — || — || 10–9
|- bgcolor="ccffcc"
| 20 || May 14 || Beaneaters || 6–3 ||  ||  || — || — || 11–9
|- bgcolor="ccffcc"
| 21 || May 15 || Beaneaters || 7–5 ||  ||  || — || — || 12–9
|- bgcolor="ccffcc"
| 22 || May 16 || Phillies || 8–3 ||  ||  || — || — || 13–9
|- bgcolor="ffbbbb"
| 23 || May 17 || Phillies || 3–4 ||  ||  || — || — || 13–10
|- bgcolor="ccffcc"
| 24 || May 18 || Phillies || 11–4 ||  ||  || — || — || 14–10
|- bgcolor="ffbbbb"
| 25 || May 20 || @ Orphans || 3–6 ||  ||  || — || — || 14–11
|- bgcolor="ffbbbb"
| 26 || May 21 || Superbas || 5–7 ||  ||  || — || — || 14–12
|- bgcolor="ffbbbb"
| 27 || May 22 || Superbas || 1–4 ||  ||  || — || — || 14–13
|- bgcolor="ccffcc"
| 28 || May 23 || Superbas || 8–5 ||  ||  || — || — || 15–13
|- bgcolor="ccffcc"
| 29 || May 24 || Superbas || 5–4 ||  ||  || — || — || 16–13
|- bgcolor="ffbbbb"
| 30 || May 25 || Giants || 3–4 ||  ||  || — || — || 16–14
|- bgcolor="ffbbbb"
| 31 || May 26 || Giants || 6–13 ||  ||  || — || — || 16–15
|- bgcolor="ccffcc"
| 32 || May 27 || @ Reds || 10–2 ||  ||  || — || — || 17–15
|- bgcolor="ccffcc"
| 33 || May 28 || Giants || 14–0 ||  ||  || — || — || 18–15
|- bgcolor="ccffcc"
| 34 || May 30 || @ Giants || 7–6 ||  ||  || — || 3,000 || 19–15
|- bgcolor="ffbbbb"
| 35 || May 30 || @ Giants || 1–9 ||  ||  || — || 15,000 || 19–16
|- bgcolor="ccffcc"
| 36 || May 31 || @ Giants || 6–4 ||  ||  || — || — || 20–16
|-

|- bgcolor="ffbbbb"
| 37 || June 1 || @ Giants || 4–6 ||  ||  || — || — || 20–17
|- bgcolor="ffbbbb"
| 38 || June 2 || @ Phillies || 2–8 ||  ||  || — || — || 20–18
|- bgcolor="ccffcc"
| 39 || June 4 || @ Phillies || 5–4 ||  ||  || — || — || 21–18
|- bgcolor="ffbbbb"
| 40 || June 5 || @ Phillies || 5–6 ||  ||  || — || — || 21–19
|- bgcolor="ccffcc"
| 41 || June 6 || @ Phillies || 6–3 ||  ||  || — || — || 22–19
|- bgcolor="ccffcc"
| 42 || June 7 || @ Superbas || 7–4 ||  ||  || — || — || 23–19
|- bgcolor="ffbbbb"
| 43 || June 9 || @ Superbas || 3–9 ||  ||  || — || — || 23–20
|- bgcolor="ffbbbb"
| 44 || June 11 || @ Superbas || 7–8 ||  ||  || — || — || 23–21
|- bgcolor="ffbbbb"
| 45 || June 12 || @ Beaneaters || 1–3 ||  ||  || — || — || 23–22
|- bgcolor="ffbbbb"
| 46 || June 13 || @ Beaneaters || 0–1 ||  ||  || — || — || 23–23
|- bgcolor="ffbbbb"
| 47 || June 14 || @ Beaneaters || 3–7 ||  ||  || — || — || 23–24
|- bgcolor="ffbbbb"
| 48 || June 16 || Orphans || 5–8 ||  ||  || — || — || 23–25
|- bgcolor="ffbbbb"
| 49 || June 17 || @ Orphans || 1–8 ||  ||  || — || — || 23–26
|- bgcolor="ccffcc"
| 50 || June 18 || @ Orphans || 4–1 ||  ||  || — || — || 24–26
|- bgcolor="ffbbbb"
| 51 || June 19 || @ Orphans || 0–1 ||  ||  || — || — || 24–27
|- bgcolor="ccffcc"
| 52 || June 20 || @ Orphans || 8–1 ||  ||  || — || — || 25–27
|- bgcolor="ccffcc"
| 53 || June 26 || Orphans || 8–6 ||  ||  || — || — || 26–27
|- bgcolor="ccffcc"
| 54 || June 27 || Orphans || 9–2 ||  ||  || — || — || 27–27
|- bgcolor="ccffcc"
| 55 || June 28 || Phillies || 3–0 ||  ||  || — || — || 28–27
|- bgcolor="ffbbbb"
| 56 || June 29 || Phillies || 2–4 ||  ||  || — || — || 28–28
|- bgcolor="ccffcc"
| 57 || June 30 || Phillies || 5–3 ||  ||  || — || — || 29–28
|-

|- bgcolor="ccffcc"
| 58 || July 1 || @ Reds || 6–0 ||  ||  || — || — || 30–28
|- bgcolor="ccffcc"
| 59 || July 2 || Beaneaters || 2–1 ||  ||  || — || — || 31–28
|- bgcolor="ccffcc"
| 60 || July 3 || Beaneaters || 2–1 ||  ||  || — || — || 32–28
|- bgcolor="ccffcc"
| 61 || July 4 || Beaneaters || 8–6 ||  ||  || — || — || 33–28
|- bgcolor="ccffcc"
| 62 || July 4 || Beaneaters || 3–1 ||  ||  || — || 10,500 || 34–28
|- bgcolor="ffbbbb"
| 63 || July 5 || Giants || 3–7 ||  ||  || — || — || 34–29
|- bgcolor="ccffcc"
| 64 || July 7 || Giants || 4–3 ||  ||  || — || — || 35–29
|- bgcolor="ffbbbb"
| 65 || July 8 || @ Cardinals || 3–17 ||  ||  || — || — || 35–30
|- bgcolor="ffbbbb"
| 66 || July 10 || Superbas || 2–4 ||  ||  || — || — || 35–31
|- bgcolor="ccffcc"
| 67 || July 11 || Superbas || 4–0 ||  ||  || — || — || 36–31
|- bgcolor="ccffcc"
| 68 || July 12 || Superbas || 7–6 ||  ||  || — || — || 37–31
|- bgcolor="ffbbbb"
| 69 || July 13 || Phillies || 8–23 ||  ||  || — || — || 37–32
|- bgcolor="ccffcc"
| 70 || July 14 || @ Orphans || 6–1 ||  ||  || — || — || 38–32
|- bgcolor="ffbbbb"
| 71 || July 15 || @ Orphans || 3–5 ||  ||  || — || — || 38–33
|- bgcolor="ccffcc"
| 72 || July 16 || @ Orphans || 7–3 ||  ||  || — || — || 39–33
|- bgcolor="ccffcc"
| 73 || July 17 || Orphans || 2–0 ||  ||  || — || — || 40–33
|- bgcolor="ffbbbb"
| 74 || July 19 || @ Phillies || 3–4 ||  ||  || — || — || 40–34
|- bgcolor="ffbbbb"
| 75 || July 20 || @ Phillies || 4–7 ||  ||  || — || — || 40–35
|- bgcolor="ffbbbb"
| 76 || July 21 || @ Phillies || 0–3 ||  ||  || — || — || 40–36
|- bgcolor="ffbbbb"
| 77 || July 24 || @ Giants || 1–2 ||  ||  || — || — || 40–37
|- bgcolor="ccffcc"
| 78 || July 25 || @ Giants || 11–3 ||  ||  || — || — || 41–37
|- bgcolor="ffbbbb"
| 79 || July 27 || @ Beaneaters || 2–3 ||  ||  || — || — || 41–38
|- bgcolor="ccffcc"
| 80 || July 28 || @ Beaneaters || 9–2 ||  ||  || — || — || 42–38
|- bgcolor="ccffcc"
| 81 || July 31 || @ Superbas || 17–1 ||  ||  || — || — || 43–38
|-

|- bgcolor="ffbbbb"
| 82 || August 1 || @ Superbas || 6–10 ||  ||  || — || — || 43–39
|- bgcolor="ccffcc"
| 83 || August 4 || Phillies || 4–3 ||  ||  || — || — || 44–39
|- bgcolor="ffbbbb"
| 84 || August 5 || @ Reds || 1–3 ||  ||  || — || — || 44–40
|- bgcolor="ccffcc"
| 85 || August 6 || Phillies || 7–3 ||  ||  || — || — || 45–40
|- bgcolor="ccffcc"
| 86 || August 7 || Phillies || 9–0 ||  ||  || — || — || 46–40
|- bgcolor="ccffcc"
| 87 || August 8 || Beaneaters || 6–3 ||  ||  || — || — || 47–40
|- bgcolor="ffbbbb"
| 88 || August 9 || Beaneaters || 2–3 ||  ||  || — || — || 47–41
|- bgcolor="ccffcc"
| 89 || August 11 || Beaneaters || 5–1 ||  ||  || — || — || 48–41
|- bgcolor="ccffcc"
| 90 || August 12 || @ Orphans || 6–2 ||  ||  || — || — || 49–41
|- bgcolor="ffbbbb"
| 91 || August 13 || Giants || 4–7 ||  ||  || — || — || 49–42
|- bgcolor="ccffcc"
| 92 || August 14 || Giants || 5–0 ||  ||  || — || — || 50–42
|- bgcolor="ccffcc"
| 93 || August 14 || Giants || 7–1 ||  ||  || — || 4,600 || 51–42
|- bgcolor="ccffcc"
| 94 || August 15 || Giants || 6–2 ||  ||  || — || — || 52–42
|- bgcolor="ffbbbb"
| 95 || August 16 || Superbas || 0–8 ||  ||  || — || — || 52–43
|- bgcolor="ccffcc"
| 96 || August 17 || Superbas || 5–3 ||  ||  || — || — || 53–43
|- bgcolor="ccffcc"
| 97 || August 18 || Superbas || 8–4 ||  ||  || — || — || 54–43
|- bgcolor="ffbbbb"
| 98 || August 20 || Giants || 2–4 ||  ||  || — || — || 54–44
|- bgcolor="ffbbbb"
| 99 || August 23 || Reds || 2–3 ||  ||  || — || — || 54–45
|- bgcolor="ffbbbb"
| 100 || August 24 || Reds || 2–11 ||  ||  || — || — || 54–46
|- bgcolor="ccffcc"
| 101 || August 25 || Reds || 6–5 ||  ||  || — || — || 55–46
|- bgcolor="ffbbbb"
| 102 || August 26 || @ Reds || 0–1 ||  ||  || — || — || 55–47
|- bgcolor="ccffcc"
| 103 || August 30 || Cardinals || 11–3 ||  ||  || — || — || 56–47
|- bgcolor="ffbbbb"
| 104 || August 31 || Cardinals || 5–10 ||  ||  || — || — || 56–48
|-

|- bgcolor="ccffcc"
| 105 || September 1 || Cardinals || 2–1 ||  ||  || — || — || 57–48
|- bgcolor="ccffcc"
| 106 || September 3 || @ Beaneaters || 8–7 ||  ||  || — || 2,500 || 58–48
|- bgcolor="ccffcc"
| 107 || September 3 || @ Beaneaters || 14–1 ||  ||  || — || 5,000 || 59–48
|- bgcolor="ccffcc"
| 108 || September 4 || @ Beaneaters || 9–0 ||  ||  || — || — || 60–48
|- bgcolor="ccffcc"
| 109 || September 4 || @ Beaneaters || 6–5 ||  ||  || — || 2,500 || 61–48
|- bgcolor="ccffcc"
| 110 || September 5 || @ Beaneaters || 5–2 ||  ||  || — || — || 62–48
|- bgcolor="ccffcc"
| 111 || September 6 || @ Superbas || 9–2 ||  ||  || — || — || 63–48
|- bgcolor="ffffff"
| 112 || September 7 || @ Superbas || 6–6 ||  ||  || — || — || 63–48
|- bgcolor="ccffcc"
| 113 || September 8 || @ Superbas || 15–7 ||  ||  || — || — || 64–48
|- bgcolor="ffbbbb"
| 114 || September 8 || @ Superbas || 5–6 ||  ||  || — || — || 64–49
|- bgcolor="ccffcc"
| 115 || September 10 || @ Superbas || 6–5 ||  ||  || — || — || 65–49
|- bgcolor="ccffcc"
| 116 || September 11 || @ Phillies || 2–0 ||  ||  || — || — || 66–49
|- bgcolor="ccffcc"
| 117 || September 12 || @ Phillies || 10–9 ||  ||  || — || 3,000 || 67–49
|- bgcolor="ffbbbb"
| 118 || September 13 || @ Phillies || 6–11 ||  ||  || — || — || 67–50
|- bgcolor="ffbbbb"
| 119 || September 15 || @ Giants || 1–2 ||  ||  || — || — || 67–51
|- bgcolor="ccffcc"
| 120 || September 17 || @ Giants || 12–3 ||  ||  || — || — || 68–51
|- bgcolor="ccffcc"
| 121 || September 18 || @ Giants || 9–4 ||  ||  || — || — || 69–51
|- bgcolor="ccffcc"
| 122 || September 19 || @ Giants || 5–2 ||  ||  || — || — || 70–51
|- bgcolor="ccffcc"
| 123 || September 20 || Cardinals || 10–4 ||  ||  || — || — || 71–51
|- bgcolor="ccffcc"
| 124 || September 21 || Cardinals || 7–3 ||  ||  || — || — || 72–51
|- bgcolor="ffbbbb"
| 125 || September 22 || Cardinals || 6–7 ||  ||  || — || — || 72–52
|- bgcolor="ccffcc"
| 126 || September 23 || @ Cardinals || 3–1 ||  ||  || — || — || 73–52
|- bgcolor="ffbbbb"
| 127 || September 24 || @ Cardinals || 0–1 ||  ||  || — || — || 73–53
|- bgcolor="ffbbbb"
| 128 || September 26 || Reds || 4–6 ||  ||  || — || — || 73–54
|- bgcolor="ffbbbb"
| 129 || September 27 || Reds || 1–4 ||  ||  || — || — || 73–55
|- bgcolor="ccffcc"
| 130 || September 28 || Reds || 8–1 ||  ||  || — || — || 74–55
|- bgcolor="ffbbbb"
| 131 || September 29 || Reds || 1–2 ||  ||  || — || — || 74–56
|- bgcolor="ffbbbb"
| 132 || September 30 || @ Reds || 3–4 ||  ||  || — || — || 74–57
|-

|- bgcolor="ffbbbb"
| 133 || October 6 || Cardinals || 3–4 ||  ||  || — || — || 74–58
|- bgcolor="ccffcc"
| 134 || October 7 || @ Cardinals || 3–2 ||  ||  || — || — || 75–58
|- bgcolor="ccffcc"
| 135 || October 8 || @ Cardinals || 8–0 ||  ||  || — || — || 76–58
|- bgcolor="ccffcc"
| 136 || October 8 || @ Cardinals || 8–2 ||  ||  || — || 1,300 || 77–58
|- bgcolor="ffbbbb"
| 137 || October 9 || @ Cardinals || 4–8 ||  ||  || — || — || 77–59
|- bgcolor="ccffcc"
| 138 || October 11 || Orphans || 2–1 ||  ||  || — || — || 78–59
|- bgcolor="ccffcc"
| 139 || October 12 || Orphans || 10–6 ||  ||  || — || — || 79–59
|- bgcolor="ffbbbb"
| 140 || October 13 || Orphans || 5–7 ||  ||  || — || — || 79–60
|-

|-
| Legend:       = Win       = Loss       = TieBold = Pittsburgh Pirates team member

Record vs. opponents

Detailed records

Notable transactions 
 May 22, 1900: Jack O'Connor was purchased by the Pirates from the St. Louis Cardinals for $2,000.

Roster

Player stats

Batting

Starters by position 
Note: Pos = Position; G = Games played; AB = At bats; H = Hits; Avg. = Batting average; HR = Home runs; RBI = Runs batted in

Other batters 
Note: G = Games played; AB = At bats; H = Hits; Avg. = Batting average; HR = Home runs; RBI = Runs batted in

Pitching

Starting pitchers 
Note: G = Games pitched; IP = Innings pitched; W = Wins; L = Losses; ERA = Earned run average; SO = Strikeouts

Other pitchers 
Note: G = Games pitched; IP = Innings pitched; W = Wins; L = Losses; ERA = Earned run average; SO = Strikeouts

Relief pitchers 
Note: G = Games pitched; W = Wins; L = Losses; SV = Saves; ERA = Earned run average; SO = Strikeouts

Postseason

1900 Chronicle Telegraph Cup 

The Chronicle Telegraph Cup was held just once, in 1900, and was sponsored by the Pittsburgh Chronicle Telegraph, a newspaper in the hometown of the National League's second-place finisher, the Pirates. It pitted the Pirates against the first-place Brooklyn Superbas in a best-of-five postseason series. The Superbas won the series, 3 games to 1.

Notes

References

External links
 1900 Pittsburgh Pirates team page at Baseball Reference
 1900 Pittsburgh Pirates Page at Baseball Almanac

Pittsburgh Pirates seasons
Pittsburgh Pirates season
Pittsburg Pir